Oleksandr Tsybenko is a retired Ukrainian professional footballer who played as a midfielder.

Career
Oleksandr Tsybenko started his career with Yunist Chernihiv, the young team in the city of Chernihiv. In 1993 he moved to Dynamo-3 Kyiv in Ukrainian Football Amateur League where he played 1 match in the 1993–94 season.In 1995 he moved to Ros Bila Tserkva where he played 13 matches and finished 13th in the 1995–96 Ukrainian Second League season.In 1999 he moved to Desna Chernihiv, the main club in Chernihiv, in Ukrainian Second League. Here he played 12 matches in 1999–2000 where he finished in 9th place with the club. In 2001 he moved to Yevropa Pryluky where he played until 2002 and where he played 34 matches and scored 16 goals. In 2003 he moved to FC Nizhyn where he played 4 matches, scored 1 goal, and won the Chernihiv Oblast Football Cup.

Honours
Nizhyn
 Chernihiv Oblast Football Cup: 2003

References

External links 
 Oleksandr Tsybenko at footballfacts.ru

1980 births
Living people
Footballers from Chernihiv
FC Desna Chernihiv players
FC Yunist Chernihiv players
FC Dynamo-3 Kyiv players
FC Ros Bila Tserkva players
Ukrainian footballers
Ukrainian Premier League players
Ukrainian First League players
Ukrainian Second League players
Association football midfielders